Grace Peak is a mountain located in Essex County, New York. It is part of the Dix Range, named after John A. Dix (1798–1879), New York Secretary of State in 1837, and later Governor. The mountain was formerly called East Dix, but in 2014 it was officially renamed Grace Peak in honor of Grace Hudowalski (1906–2004), who in 1937 became the ninth person and first woman to climb all 46 of the Adirondack High Peaks. Grace Peak is flanked to the northeast by Spotted Mountain, and to the southwest by South Dix.

The northwest side of Grace Peak drains into the headwaters of the South Fork of the Boquet River, thence into Lake Champlain, which drains into Canada's Richelieu River, the Saint Lawrence River, and into the Gulf of Saint Lawrence.
The east side of Grace Peak drains into Lindsay Brook, thence into the Schroon River, the Hudson River, and into New York Bay.
The south side of Grace Peak drains into West Mill Brook, thence into the Schroon River.

Grace Peak is within the Dix Mountain Wilderness Area of Adirondack State Park.

See also 
 List of mountains in New York
 Northeast 111 4,000-footers
 Adirondack High Peaks
 Adirondack Forty-Sixers

References

External links 
 
 

Mountains of Essex County, New York
Adirondack High Peaks
Mountains of New York (state)